Charles, Duke of Berry  may refer to:
 Charles VII of France (1403–1461) was previously Charles, Duke of Berry
 Charles de Valois, Duke of Berry (1446–1472), son of Charles VII of France
 Charles de France, Duke of Berry (1686–1714), grandson of Louis XIV of France
 Charles X of France (1757–1836) was previously Charles, Duke of Berry
 Charles Ferdinand (d'Artois), Duke of Berry (1778–1820), son of Charles X of France